Karl Senior (born 3 September 1972 in Northwich) is an English former footballer.

A Midfielder, Senior made one Football League appearance in his career when he came on for Chester City (where he was an apprentice) in a 1–0 defeat at Mansfield Town on 20 January 1990. He was one of three youngsters during the season to make a solitary substitute appearance for Chester, along with Mick Hayde and Derek Nassari.

Senior did not make any more first–team appearances for Chester and later joined Northwich Victoria.

Bibliography

References

1972 births
Living people
English footballers
English Football League players
Sportspeople from Northwich
Association football midfielders
Chester City F.C. players
Northwich Victoria F.C. players